Clavams are a class of antibiotics. This antibiotic is derived from Streptomyces clavuligerus NRRL 3585. Clavam is produced to form a new β-lactam antibiotic. This class is divided into the clavulanic acid class and the 5S clavams class. Clavulanic acid is a broad-spectrum antibiotic and 5S clavams may have anti-fungal properties. They are similar to penams, but with an oxygen substituted for the sulfur. Thus, they are also known as oxapenams.

An example is clavulanic acid, from which this compound class receives its name.

Clavulanic acid, a type of Clavam, has antibiotic properties. It can be used as a medication to treat a variety of bacterial infections. CLAVAM tablets may be effective for short-term treatment of bronchitis, cystitis, sinusitis, otitis media, or skin infections. Clavams are commonly used in conjunction with other antibiotics such as amoxicillin to produce a broader therapeutic effect.

Clavulanic acid strongly inhibits b-lactamase in bacteria, which is associated with its antibiotic properties. B - lactam antibiotics generally have a common feature which is the 3-carbon and 1-nitrogen ring (beta-lactam ring) that is highly reactive. Different molecules of the Clavam class have been shown to inhibit the action of several fungal species. 5S Clavams do not have an inhibitory effect on b-lactamase, but are involved in methionine biosynthesis inhibition, making them bacteriostatic agents. Additionally, 5S Clavams may have inhibitory effects on RNA synthesis, which is a common property of anti-fungal medications. Clavams have wide-ranging bioactivity, and may have greater therapeutic use than current research indicates. Because of their activity on b-lactamase, this class of antibiotics can evade antibiotic resistance in bacteria, which is a risk associated with other antibiotics such as penicillins.

Regulation of Clavam-biosynthesis in S. clavuligerus 
In S Clavuligerus infection, a Streptomyces antibiotic regulatory protein known as CcaR (cephamycin and clavulanic acid regulator) are encoded into the Cephamycin gene cluster. This is essential for the cephamycin C and clavulanic acid but not the 5S claims. CcaR is important for the expression of polycistronic transcripts, which are early genes for clavulanic acid biosynthesis. This is also a key factor for activating its own transcription by binding to its own promoting region.

References

Beta-lactamase inhibitors
Lactams